Charles West Kendall (April 22, 1828 – June 25, 1914) was an American politician, lawyer, librarian, editor, proprietor and miner in California, Nevada and Colorado.

Biography
Charles West Kendall was born in Searsmont, Maine, on April 22, 1828. Kendall attended Phillips Academy and Yale College. He moved to California in 1849, where he engaged in mining. He became editor and proprietor of the San Jose Tribune from 1855 to 1859.

Kendall studied law and was admitted to the bar in 1859, after which he commenced a practice in Sacramento, California. He was a member of the California State Assembly in 1862 and 1863, representing Tuolumne and Mono counties, and then moved to Hamilton, Nevada, where he continued to practice law. Kendall was elected a Democrat to the United States House of Representatives in 1870, serving from 1871 to 1875, declining to be a candidate for renomination in 1874. Afterwards, he moved to Denver, Colorado, and resumed practicing law. He served as assistant librarian in the Interstate Commerce Commission in Washington, D.C., from 1892 until his death in Mount Rainier, Maryland, on June 25, 1914. Kendall was interred in Congressional Cemetery in Washington.

References

1828 births
1914 deaths
Democratic Party members of the California State Assembly
Lawyers from Sacramento, California
Nevada lawyers
Lawyers from Denver
People of the Interstate Commerce Commission
19th-century American newspaper editors
American miners
Phillips Academy alumni
Yale College alumni
Politicians from San Jose, California
Politicians from Sacramento, California
Politicians from Denver
People from Searsmont, Maine
Burials at the Congressional Cemetery
People from Mount Rainier, Maryland
Democratic Party members of the United States House of Representatives from Nevada
19th-century American politicians
19th-century American lawyers